Grover was an unincorporated community in western St. Louis County, Missouri, United States. It was located on Old Manchester Road (part of the original alignment of U.S. Route 66), but has now been wholly incorporated into Wildwood, whose City Hall is located in old Grover.

References

Unincorporated communities in St. Louis County, Missouri
Unincorporated communities in Missouri